Ceren Moray (born 5 June 1985) is a Turkish actress known for her roles in TV series Kavak Yelleri (remake of Dawson's Creek), hit comedy series "İşler Güçler" and drama "Avlu", O Hayat Benim. Moray known for her naturalist style acting.

Life and career 
Moray was born in 1985 in Diyarbakır as an only child of her family. Her father is from Diyarbakır and her mother is from Kastamonu. Her paternal family is of Kurdish origin, and her parents were civil servants.
A few years after her birth, Moray and her family moved to İstanbul, where she received theatrical education at her earlier ages. After training at Pera Fine Arts High School, she got into the Haliç University in 2005 and graduated from the university in 2009.

Moray has been married to Nicco Brun, a French citizen, since 2017.

Filmography

References

External links 
Official instagram page

1985 births
Living people
Turkish film actresses
Turkish television actresses
21st-century Turkish actresses
Turkish people of Kurdish descent
People from Diyarbakır
People from Kastamonu